Joseph De Combe (19 June 1901 – 28 December 1965) was a Belgian swimmer and water polo player who competed in the 1924 Summer Olympics, 1928 Summer Olympics and 1936 Summer Olympics.

In the 1924 Olympics he won a silver medal in the 200 m breaststroke event. He also was a member of Belgian water polo team, which won a silver medal. He played one match. Four years later he did not finish in his first round heat of the 200 m breaststroke event and did not advance. In the 1936 Olympics he was a member of Belgian water polo team, which won a bronze medal. He played all seven matches.

See also
 List of Olympic medalists in swimming (men)
 List of Olympic medalists in water polo (men)

References

External links
 

1901 births
1965 deaths
Belgian male breaststroke swimmers
Belgian male water polo players
Olympic swimmers of Belgium
Olympic water polo players of Belgium
Swimmers at the 1924 Summer Olympics
Swimmers at the 1928 Summer Olympics
Water polo players at the 1924 Summer Olympics
Water polo players at the 1936 Summer Olympics
Olympic silver medalists for Belgium
Olympic bronze medalists for Belgium
Olympic bronze medalists in swimming
Olympic medalists in water polo
Medalists at the 1936 Summer Olympics
Medalists at the 1924 Summer Olympics
Place of birth missing
Olympic silver medalists in swimming
20th-century Belgian people